Gallium palladide (GaPd or PdGa) is an intermetallic combination of gallium and palladium. In the Iron monosilicide crystal structure. The compound has been suggested as an improved catalyst for hydrogenation reactions. In principle, gallium palladide can be a more selective catalyst since unlike substituted compounds, the palladium atoms are spaced out in a regular crystal structure rather than randomly.

References 

Intermetallics
Palladium compounds
Gallium compounds
Iron monosilicide structure type